Sukakpak Mountain is a prominent 4,459-foot (1,359 meter) mountain summit located in the Philip Smith Mountains of the Brooks Range, in the U.S. state of Alaska. The peak's Sukakpak name was reported in 1930 by the USGS as an Inupiat word, said to mean "marten deadfall." From the north, the mountain resembles a carefully balanced log used to trap marten. The name was officially adopted in 1932 by the U.S. Board on Geographic Names.

This famous landmark is notable for its west face, a massive wall of Skajit limestone rising nearly 3,000 feet (900 m) above the surrounding valley. Peculiar ice-cored mounds known as palsas punctuate the ground at the base of the mountain. Sukakpak Mountain was designated in 1990 as a BLM Area of Critical Environmental Concern to protect this extraordinary scenic and geologic formation.

Climate

Based on the Köppen climate classification, Sukakpak Mountain is located in a subarctic climate zone with long, cold, winters, and short, cool summers. Temperatures can drop below −30 °C with wind chill factors below −50 °C. The months June through August offer the most favorable weather for viewing and climbing.

See also

List of mountain peaks of Alaska
Geography of Alaska
Snowden Mountain

References

Gallery

External links

 Weather forecast: Sukakpak Mountain
 View from summit: Flickr photo
 Sukakpak pronunciation

Mountains of Alaska
Landforms of Yukon–Koyukuk Census Area, Alaska
Brooks Range
North American 1000 m summits